Montana Western Railway may refer to:
Montana Western Railway (1909–1970), Conrad to Valier
Montana Western Railway (1986–2003), Butte to Garrison